Shanna Dophalene Collins is an American actress.  She played Amber  on the first season of the ABC Family original series, Wildfire. Collins graduated from Highland Park High School in University Park, Texas. 

Collins played Laurie Miller on the CBS series Swingtown.

Filmography

Film

Television

References

External links

American film actresses
American television actresses
Living people
Actresses from Dallas
21st-century American actresses
Year of birth missing (living people)